Igor Shvyrev (born July 10, 1998) is a Russian professional ice hockey forward who is currently playing for HC Tambov of the Supreme Hockey League (VHL). He was selected in the fifth round, 125th overall, by the Colorado Avalanche in the 2017 NHL Entry Draft.

Playing career
Shvyrev as a native of Magnitogorsk, played as a junior within the ranks of Metallurg Magnitogorsk of the Kontinental Hockey League (KHL). He made his debut in the MHL with junior academy club, Stalnye Lisy Magnitogorsk in the 2014–15 season, scoring 8 points in 17 games as a 16-year-old.

Showing offensive potential, before the beginning of the MHL season, Shvyrev opened the 2015–16 season on Metallurg's KHL roster. He made his professional debut in the KHL as a 17-year-old, appearing in a 2–1 defeat to Avtomobilist Yekaterinburg, on August 30, 2015. Shryrev was then reassigned to join Stalnye Lisy for the duration of the season, posting 12 goals and 38 points in 44 games. Despite producing offensively with Stalnye Lisy, Shvyrev was passed over in the first year of his eligibility at the 2016 NHL Entry Draft.

Having signed a two-year contract with Metallurg Magnitogorsk, Shvyrev appeared in 10 games during the 2016–17 season, going scoreless while averaging under 2 minute's a game. Shvyrev however in continuing to split the campaign with the MHL, broke out offensively centering the top line in registering 21 goals and 49 assists for 70 points in just 40 games. Showing his scoring touch and two-way ability, Shvyrev gained attention of the NHL scouts and was selected in the fifth round, 125th overall, by the Colorado Avalanche in the 2017 NHL Entry Draft.

In his third season with Metallurg Magnitogorsk, Shvyrev scored his first career goal and point on the opening night of the 2017–18 season, in a 3–2 defeat to Amur Khabarovsk on September 1, 2017. Shvyrev remained in the KHL to appear in a career high 32 games. Despite continued limited ice time due to his youth, Shvyrev would not add to his opening night goal and continued to play junior, appearing in 10 games for 17 points. He made his post-season debut with Magnitogorsk appearing in 3 games before their second round exit to eventual Gagarin Cup champions, Ak Bars Kazan.

With his contract up for renewal with Magnitogorsk, Shvyrev opted to further his development in North America by agreeing to a three-year, entry-level contract with the Colorado Avalanche on May 9, 2018. After attending his first training camp with the Avalanche in 2018, Shvyrev was reassigned to AHL affiliate, the Colorado Eagles, for their inaugural 2018–19 season in the AHL. He made his North American debut and scored the game-tying goal to get the Eagles to overtime in their opening night defeat to the Chicago Wolves on October 5, 2018.

In his second season within the Avalanche organization, Shvyrev continued with the Colorado Eagles, however stagnated in his development in the 2019–20 season, limited to the fourth-line in posting 6 goals and 9 points in 49 games. On May 28, 2020, Shvyrev was placed on and cleared unconditional waivers, mutually terminating the final year of his entry-level contract with the Colorado Avalanche.

On 12 June 2020, having returned to his native Russia, Shvyrev agreed to re-join Metallurg Magnitogorsk of the KHL on a two-year contract. In his first full season in the KHL in 2020–21, Shvyrev played in a fourth line role, adding 3 goals and 8 points through 49 regular season games.

In the following 2021–22 season, Shvyrev was limited to just four scoreless games before his tenure with Magnitogorsk ended after he was traded to fellow KHL club HC Spartak Moscow. He made 17 further appearances in the KHL registering just 3 assists before he opted to leave Russia mid-season and join Czech club, HC Dynamo Pardubice of the Czech Extraliga, on 2 January 2022. He made just 7 appearances with Pardubice, before he left the club at the conclusion of the season.

Remaining a free agent mid-way into the 2022–23 season, Shvyrev belatedly signed a contract with Russian VHL club, HC Tambov, on 31 December 2022.

International play

Shvyrev represented Russia at the junior level in the 2015 Ivan Hlinka Memorial Tournament. He produced 1 assist in 5 games in helping Russia claim the Bronze medal.

Career statistics

Regular season and playoffs

International

Awards and honours

References

External links

1998 births
Living people
Colorado Avalanche draft picks
Colorado Eagles players
HC Dynamo Pardubice players
Metallurg Magnitogorsk players
People from Magnitogorsk
HC Spartak Moscow players
Stalnye Lisy players
Russian ice hockey centres
Sportspeople from Chelyabinsk Oblast
Russian expatriate sportspeople in the United States
Russian expatriate sportspeople in the Czech Republic
Russian expatriate ice hockey people
Expatriate ice hockey players in the United States
Expatriate ice hockey players in the Czech Republic